Ramon Wayne "Ra" McGuire (born June 13, 1950) is a Canadian singer, songwriter, and founding and longtime member of the rock band Trooper. Ra (pronounced "Ray") has performed with Trooper and Brian Smith from 1975, when their first album was released, to the present day.

As a songwriter, McGuire has been nominated four times for the 'Composer of the Year' Juno Award. As the singer for Trooper, his recordings have been nominated twice for 'Album of the Year', once for 'Best Selling Album of the Year', and Trooper won the Juno Award for 'Group of the Year' in 1980 after two previous nominations for that award in 1978 and 1979. In 1980 McGuire received a BC CARAS (JUNO) Award for Best Male Vocalist.

Biography 

Born in Vancouver, British Columbia, McGuire and his wife, Debbie, spearheaded the formation of a Fine Arts based school in the Surrey, British Columbia school district from 1996 to 1998. The school is now housed at White Rock Elementary with another proposed for the northern end of the city. In 2005 the couple (unsuccessfully) fought high rise development in their hometown of White Rock, British Columbia.

At the 1999 SOCAN Awards, McGuire received a SOCAN Classic Award for the Trooper hit "Two for the Show", presented for songs that have received over 100,000 documented radio plays. He received two additional Classic Awards with songwriting partner Brian Smith for "We're Here for a Good Time" and "Santa Maria".

McGuire received a fourth SOCAN Classic Award in 2005, for "Oh, Pretty Lady."

In 2006, McGuire published an account of life on the road with Trooper, Here for a Good Time, with Insomniac Press. 

In 2007, he served as one of three judges for the CBC's Seven Wonders of Canada competition and co-produced his son, Connor McGuire's first solo album, Different After Dawn.

McGuire was featured when Trooper performed in the 2010 Olympics Victory Ceremonies in Vancouver on February 21, 2010. Coverage of the event was broadcast in Canada and around the world on networks such as CTV and Much Music.

On April 25, 2012, Ra and Debbie McGuire were awarded the World Harmony Run's Torchbearer Award  for their collaborative commitment to inspire cultural harmony and community spirit through music, and champion the importance of fine arts in education.

On November 19, 2012, McGuire was presented with a SOCAN National Achievement Award, which is presented to artists who have had outstanding success, predominantly in the Canadian music industry, over the span of their career. He also received three more SOCAN Classic Awards for "Raise A Little Hell", "General Hand Grenade", and "Janine", co-written with songwriting partner Brian Smith.

Retirement 

Quoted from their official Facebook group, as of November 8, 2021, the final two founding members are retiring:

"We have some news. Ra and Smitty are officially retiring. They've already been *unofficially* retired for a year and a half, so they've just decided to continue not working, since they've realized that they're getting pretty good at it. They are both healthy and happy, they've just decided that this is the best time to step back from the road and enjoy the life that this unplanned time-off has dropped them into. It's been a difficult decision and today marks a bittersweet and emotional turning point in their lives. They send their love to all their fans, friends, and everyone with whom they've shared the joyous, rockin', love-filled cross-Canada party that is Trooper. They will sorely miss you all.

BUT HOLD ON ... If you've been looking forward to the next Trooper show, don't despair. Ra and Smitty have given their blessing to the rest of the band and crew to carry on as Trooper without them! More on this soon."

References

External links 
 Ra McGuire's website
 Trooper official website

1950 births
Canadian rock singers
Canadian male singers
Canadian songwriters
Canadian memoirists
Living people
Musicians from Vancouver
Writers from Vancouver